Lysianassidae is a family of marine amphipods, containing the following genera:

Acontiostoma Stebbing, 1888
Alibrotus Milne-Edwards, 1840
Allogaussia Schellenberg, 1926
Ambasia Boeck, 1871
Ambasiella Schellenberg, 1935
Amphorites Lowry & Stoddart, 2012
Aristiopsis J. L. Barnard, 1961
Aruga Homes, 1908
Arugella Pirlot, 1936
Azotostoma J. L. Barnard, 1965
Boeckosimus J. L. Barnard, 1969
Bonassa Barnard & Karaman, 1991
Bruunosa Barnard & Karaman, 1987
Callisoma Costa, 1851
Cedrosella Barnard & Karaman, 1987
Cheirimedon Stebbing, 1888
Concarnes Barnard & Karaman, 1991
Conicostoma Lowry & Stoddart, 1983
Coximedon Barnard & Karaman, 1991
Dartenassa Barnard & Karaman, 1991
Dissiminassa Barnard & Karaman, 1991
Elimedon J. L. Barnard, 1962
Falklandia De Broyer, 1985
Gronella Barnard & Karaman, 1991
Guerina Della Valle, 1893
Hippomedon Boeck, 1871
Kakanui Lowry & Stoddart, 1983
Lepidepecreoides K. H. Barnard, 1931
Lepidepecreum Bate & Westwood, 1868
Lepiduristes Barnard & Karaman, 1987
Lucayarina Clark & Barnard, 1985
Lysianassa Milne-Edwards, 1830
Lysianassina A. Costa, 1867
Lysianella G. O. Sars, 1882
Lysianopsis Holmes, 1903
Macronassa Barnard & Karaman, 1991
Martensia Barnard & Karaman, 1991
Metambasia Stephensen, 1923
Microlysias Stebbing, 1918
Nannonyx Sars, 1890
Ocosingo J. L. Barnard, 1964
Onesimoides Stebbing, 1888
Orchomene Boeck, 1871
Orchomenella Sars, 1890
Orchomenopsis G. O. Sars, 1895
Orchomenyx De Broyer, 1984
Orenoquia Bellan-Santini, 1997
Ottenwalderia Jaume & Wagner, 1998
Paracentromedon Chevreux & Fage, 1925
Paralysianopsis Schellenberg, 1931
Paratryphosites Stebbing, 1899
Parawaldeckia Stebbing, 1910
Pardia Ruffo, 1987
Paronesimoides Pirlot, 1933
Paronesimus Pirlot, 1933
Photosella Lowry & Stoddart, 2011
Phoxostoma K. H. Barnard, 1925
Prachynella J. L. Barnard, 1963
Pronannonyx Schellenberg, 1953
Psammonyx Bousfield, 1973
Pseudambasia Stephensen, 1927
Pseudokoroga Schellenberg, 1931
Pseudonesimoides Bellan-Santini & Ledoyer, 1974
Pseudorchomene Schellenberg, 1926
Pseudotryphosa G. O. Sars, 1891
Rhinolabia Ruffo, 1971
Rifcus Kudrjaschov, 1965
Rimakoroga Barnard & Karaman, 1987
Riwo Lowry & Stoddart, 1995
Schisturella Norman, 1900
Scolopostoma Lowry & Stoddart, 1983
Shoemakerella Pirlot, 1936
Socarnella Walker, 1904
Socarnes Boeck, 1871
Socarnoides Stebbing, 1888
Socarnopsis Chevreux, 1911
Stephensenia Schellenberg, 1928
Stomacontion Stebbing, 1899
Tantena Ortiz, Lalana & Varela, 2007
Thaumodon Lowry & Stoddart, 1995
Trischizostoma Boeck, 1861
Tryphosella Bonnier, 1893
Tryphosites G. O. Sars, 1895
Tryphosoides Schellenberg, 1931
Waldeckia Chevreux, 1907
Wecomedon Jarrett & Bousfield, 1982

References

External links

Gammaridea
Crustacean families
Taxa named by James Dwight Dana